Denovo  is an Italian New wave group formed in the early 1980s in Catania. They are also referred to as I Denovo.

Background 
The band officially debuted with the EP Niente insetti su Wilma, released in 1984, which had some local success and received several appreciations from the critics. The group had his breakout in 1987, with the album Persuasione, referred to as "one of the best products of the Italian indie scene of the 1980s". After several hits and two more albums, the group disbanded in 1990s, with Mario Venuti and Luca Madonia pursuing solo careers and Carbone focusing on production. Following several occasional reunions, notably a special appearance at the 2008 Sanremo Music Festival, the group officially reunited in 2014 for the album Kamikaze Bohemien.

Personnel  
 Mario Venuti - vocals, guitars, keyboards, horns (1982-1990) 
 Luca Madonia - vocals, guitars, keyboards  (1982-1990)
 Toni Carbone - bass (1982-1990)
 Gabriele Madonia - drums (1982-1987, 1989-1990)
 Raffaele Fazio - drums (1988)

Discography 
Albums

     1984 - Niente insetti su Wilma (EP)
     1985 - Unicanisai 
     1987 - Persuasione 
     1988 - Così fan tutti  
     1989 - Venuti dalle Madonie a cercar carbone 
     2014 - Kamikaze Bohemien

References

External links
 

Musical groups established in the 1980s
Italian pop music groups
Italian new wave musical groups